Bisindolylmaleimide is an organic compound that forms the core chemical structure of a variety of biologically active compounds.  This core structure includes a central maleimide group with two indole groups attached.

Examples of bisindolylmaleimide derivatives include:
 Bisindolylmaleimide I
 Enzastaurin
 Ruboxistaurin
 Tivantinib

References

External links